Bom Jesus  is a town and commune in the municipality of Icolo e Bengo, Luanda Province, Angola.

References

Communes in Luanda Province
Populated places in Luanda Province